Heart's Cry (Japanese :ハーツクライ 15 April 2001 – 9 March 2023) was a retired Japanese Thoroughbred racehorse and sire. In a racing career which lasted from January 2004 until November 2006 he ran nineteen times and won five races. In his first two seasons he was placed in many important races including the Tokyo Yushun, Takarazuka Kinen and Japan Cup before recording a 16/1 upset victory over the Japanese Horse of the Year Deep Impact in the Arima Kinen at Nakayama Racecourse in December 2005. In the following year Heart's Cry proved himself in international competition when winning the Dubai Sheema Classic in the United Arab Emirates and finishing third in the King George VI and Queen Elizabeth Stakes in Britain. After his retirement from racing he became a successful breeding stallion.

Background
Heart's Cry was a bay horse with a narrow white blaze and a white sock on his left hind leg, bred by the Yoshida family's Shadai Farm. He was sired by Sunday Silence, who won the 1989 Kentucky Derby, before retiring to stud in Japan where he was champion sire on thirteen consecutive occasions. His dam Irish Dance was a successful racemare who won twice at Group Three level. The horse was named after a number from the show Riverdance.

Racing career

2004: three-year-old season
Heart's Cry began his racing career by winning a ten furlong race at Kyoto Racecourse on 5 January 2004. A month later he was moved up to Group Three level and finished third in the Kisaragi Sho at the same course. He then won a ten furlong race at Hanshin Racecourse before finishing unplaced in the Satsuki Sho, the first leg of the Japanese Triple Crown. In May Heart's Cry won his first important race when he took the Group Two Kyoto Shimbun Hai, a trial race for the Tokyo Yushun (Japanese Derby), beating Suzuka Mambo by half a length. In the Tokyo Yushun four weeks later, Heart's Cry finished second of the eighteen runners, one and a half lengths behind the winner King Kamehameha.

Heart's Cry returned after a summer break to finish third to King Kamehama in the Kobe Shimbun Hai, but then finished unplaced in the Kikuka Sho (Japanese St Leger), Japan Cup and Arima Kinen.

2005: four-year-old season

In his first five starts as a four-year-old, Heart's Cry ran well without winning. In Spring he finished second in the Group Two Osaka Hai and then ran fifth of the eighteen runners behind Suzuka Mambo in the two mile Tenno Sho. In June he finished strongly to take second place, a neck behind Sweep Tosho in the Takarazuka Kinen, beating major winners such as Zenno Rob Roy and Tap Dance City. He was then off the course for more than four months.

Heart's Cry returned in October to finish sixth in the Autumn Tenno Sho, in which he was ridden for the first time by Christophe Lemaire, before running in the Japan Cup a month later. Held up in the early stages, he was still fourteenth of the eighteen runners turning into the straight but then finished strongly and failed by a nose to catch the British runner Alkaased who won in a record time of 2:22.1. The beaten runners included Zenno Rob Roy, Ouija Board, Warrsan, Bago and Better Talk Now. On 25 December, Heart's Cry was one of sixteen runners invited to contest the Arima Kinen. The colt had gone ten races and nineteen months since his last win and started at odds of 16.1/1 while the undefeated three-year-old champion Deep Impact was made the 3/10 favourite. Lemaire rode the horse close to the lead before moving to the front in the straight and holding off the late challenge of Deep Impact to win by half a length.

2006: five-year-old season
In 2006, Heart's Cry was campaigned internationally. In March he was sent to Dubai to contest the Dubai Sheema Classic at Nad Al Sheba. Ridden by Lemaire he contested the lead from the start, tactics which surprised his trainer Kojiro Hashiguchi. He went clear of the field in the straight and won by four and a quarter lengths from Collier Hill with the multiple Group One winners Ouija Board and Alexander Goldrun in fourth and fifth. In the August 2006 edition of the World Thoroughbred Racehorse Rankings, Heart's Cry was ranked the equal second best horse in the world, a pound behind Makybe Diva and equal with Electrocutionist and David Junior.

Four months after his run in Dubai, Heart's Cry appeared at Ascot Racecourse in England for Britain's most prestigious all-aged race, the King George VI and Queen Elizabeth Stakes. Lemaire claimed to be full of confidence before the race and Heart's Cry's participation attracted a large Japanese media contingent. Starting the 3/1 second favourite, he took the lead in the straight but was overtaken in the final furlong and finished third behind Hurricane Run and Electrocutionist. After his race at Ascot, Heart's Cry did not run again until the Japan Cup on 29 November. He started the 5.8/1 second favourite but ran disappointingly, finishing tenth of the eleven runners behind Deep Impact. After the race the Japan Racing Association announced that the horse had developed breathing problems which may have affected his performance, and his retirement was announced in early December.

Stud record
Heart's Cry was retired to become a stallion at his owners' Shadai Stallion Station on Hokkaido. He sired 35 individual group or graded race winners, ten of them at the highest level. In addition, Heart's Cry is the damsire of Efforia, who was named the Japanese Horse of the Year of 2021, and Tagaloa, who won the Blue Diamond Stakes in 2020. He was retired from stud duties in 2021 at the age of 20. On March 9, 2023, staffs of Shadai Stallion Station found Heart's Cry unable to stand and later passed away the same day.

Major winners
c = colt, f = filly, g = gelding

Pedigree

References

Racehorses bred in Japan
Racehorses trained in Japan
2001 racehorse births
2023 racehorse deaths
Thoroughbred family 6-a